Poor Little Sven (Swedish: Stackars lilla Sven) is a 1947 Swedish comedy film directed by Hugo Bolander and starring Nils Poppe, Annalisa Ericson and  Hjördis Petterson. The film's sets were designed by the art director Arne Åkermark. It was inspired by the plot of the 1928 British musical Mr. Cinders, which Poppe and  Ericson had appeared together in on stage.

Synopsis
Sven, an orphan, is taken care of by the generous Anton Carlsson. However when Carlson marries a baroness he becomes the stepfather of her two mean-spirited sons who make Sven's life increasingly difficult. Due to a mistake the daughter of a wealthy man is mistaken for a housemaid and she and Sven fall in love.

Cast
 Nils Poppe as Sven Carlsson
 Annalisa Ericson as 	Marianne Wennerberg
 Hjördis Petterson as 	Baroness Agata von Stråhle
 Douglas Håge as 	Anton Carlsson
 Åke Engfeldt as	Clas-Göran von Stråhle
 Hilding Gavle as 	Wennerberg
 Marianne Gyllenhammar as 	Anna-Lisa Wennerberg
 Åke Jensen as 	Christer von Stråhle
 Elisaveta as 	Donna Lucia 
 Carl-Gunnar Wingård as 	Policeman
 Julia Cæsar as Tilda, cook
 Helge Mauritz as 	Bengtsson
 Artur Rolén as 	Farmer
 Arne Lindblad as 	Policeman

References

Bibliography 
 Qvist, Per Olov & von Bagh, Peter. Guide to the Cinema of Sweden and Finland. Greenwood Publishing Group, 2000.

External links 
 

1947 films
Swedish comedy films
1947 comedy films
1940s Swedish-language films
Films directed by Hugo Bolander
1940s Swedish films